Sinazongwe is a town in the Southern Province of Zambia, lying on the north shore of Lake Kariba.  It was constructed in the 1950s as a local administrative centre, while its main industry now is kapenta fishing.  It is also home to a lighthouse and an airstrip, while ferries sail to Chete Island.
Sinazongwe also boasts The Houseboat Company.  Sinazongwe is a fast developing area in Zambia.

Sinazongwe is accessible nearly all year round. The nearest large hospital is at Maamba which is about a 40-minute drive from Sinazongwe; however, there is a small hospital in Sinazongwe as well as a local clinic.

Sinazongwe is only a three-and-a-half-hour drive from Livingstone and three-and-a-half-hour drive from Zambia's capital, Lusaka, therefore giving it good access to an international airport from either direction as well as to one of the seven-wonders of the world: Victoria Falls, Livingstone.

References

Populated places in Southern Province, Zambia